Carlos López Riaño (6 November 1940 – 15 April 2022) was a Spanish politician who served as a Deputy.

References

1940 births
2022 deaths
Spanish Socialist Workers' Party politicians
Politicians from Galicia (Spain)
Members of the 2nd Congress of Deputies (Spain)
Members of the 3rd Congress of Deputies (Spain)
Members of the 4th Congress of Deputies (Spain)
Members of the 5th Congress of Deputies (Spain)
Secretaries of State of Spain
People from Terra de Lemos